This article lists the heads of state of Haiti since the beginning of the Haitian Revolution in 1791. Full independence of Haiti was declared in 1804.

Between 1806 and 1820 Haiti was divided between the northern State, renamed Kingdom in 1811, and the southern Republic. Between 1822 and 1844 the reunified Republic of Haiti ruled over the entire island of Hispaniola, during the Haitian occupation of Santo Domingo.

Saint-Domingue (1791–1804)

First Empire of Haiti (1804–1806)

Divided Haiti (1806–1820)

State of Haiti (1806–1811)

Kingdom of Haiti (1811–1820)

Republic of Haiti (1806–1820)

Republic of Haiti (1820–1849)

Second Empire of Haiti (1849–1859)

Republic of Haiti (1859–1957)
Status

Republic of Haiti during the Duvalier dynasty (1957–1986)
Symbols
 Presidential referendum
 Constitutional referendum

Republic of Haiti (1986–present)
Symbols
 Indirect election
Status

Timeline since 1804

See also
 History of Haiti
 Saint-Domingue
 List of colonial governors of Saint-Domingue
 Politics of Haiti
 President of Haiti
 Prime Minister of Haiti
 List of prime ministers of Haiti
 List of monarchs of Haiti
 List of Haitian royal consorts

Notes

References

Haiti
Heads of state
Heads of state